is a former Japanese football player.

Playing career
Kakiuchi was born in Kanagawa Prefecture on August 31, 1969. After graduating from high school, he joined Toho Titanium. In 1992, he moved to Kyoto Shiko (later Kyoto Purple Sanga). He played many matches until 1995 and the club was promoted to the J1 League in 1996. However, he did not play as much in 1996. In 1997, he moved to the Regional Leagues club Albirex Niigata. The club was then promoted to the Japan Football League. He retired at the end of the 1998 season.

Club statistics

References

External links

kyotosangadc

1969 births
Living people
Association football people from Kanagawa Prefecture
Japanese footballers
Japan Soccer League players
J1 League players
Japan Football League (1992–1998) players
Toho Titanium SC players
Kyoto Sanga FC players
Albirex Niigata players
Association football midfielders